A tribrach is a metrical foot used in formal poetry and Greek and Latin verse. In quantitative meter (such as the meter of classical verse), it consists of three short syllables; in accentual-syllabic verse (such as formal English verse), the tribrach consists of a run of three short syllables substituted for a trochee.

A "tribrach word" is a word consisting of three short syllables, such as Latin  "shining" or Greek  "you have". An English equivalent would be a word with three short syllables such as Canada or passenger.

The origin of the word tribrach is the Greek , derived from the prefix - "three" and the adjective  "short".

Terminology

The name  is first recorded in the Roman writer Quintilian (1st century AD). However, in modern usage a run of three short syllables is always called a tribrach, while the word trochee is used of a long + short (or heavy + light, or stressed + unstressed) sequence.

The Latin writer on metrics Terentianus Maurus (2nd century AD) noted that the long syllable of a trochaic foot (– u) was often resolved into two short syllables, "hence what we call a tribrach can also be called a ".

The earliest mention of the word  in a Greek writer recorded in Liddell and Scott's lexicon is in the grammarian Hephaestion (2nd century AD), who lists the tribrach among the possible forms which a trochaic foot could take. It was also known as  "a tribrach foot".

In Latin poetry

In Latin poetry a tribrach is never found in the works of Virgil, Ovid, or Catullus, since the hexameter and hendecasyllable metres do not allow a series of more than two syllables. It is, however, fairly common in iambic and trochaic verse as used in Roman comedy in writers such as Plautus and Terence.

In iambic and trochaic metres a tribrach can replace either an iamb (u –) or a trochee (– u) at any place except immediately before the end of the line or before the central dieresis.

So for example whether in iambic or trochaic poetry a long element can be replaced by two short syllables. Usually the word accent falls at the beginning of the long syllable:

 "always something" (with a tribrach replacing u –)
 "it happened to the old men" (with a tribrach replacing – u)

There are certain rules of word division in a tribrach. This rule, however, does not apply in Greek, where word-accent has no effect on the metre.

Occasionally two tribrachs are found together in a verse:

 "when the mistress has given birth"

An example of a double tribrach in more serious verse is found in the poem said to have been written by the emperor Hadrian on his deathbed, Animula vagula blandula. Each line of the poem is in an iambic dimeter (u – u – | u – u –), but in the first and fourth lines the first two long elements are resolved into two short syllables, making a tribrach:

Poor little, wandering, charming soul
Guest and companion of my body,
What place will you go to now?
Pale, stiff, naked little thing,
Nor will you be making jokes as you usually do.

In English poetry
Just as in Latin poetry, a tribrach can replace a trochee in trochaic metre:

Humpty / Dumpty / sat on a / wall

In the music which is traditionally used for this nursery rhyme (see Humpty Dumpty), the words "Humpty" and "Dumpty" are given a quarter note + eighth note, while "sat on a" has three eighth notes.

As in Latin, a tribrach can also replace a trochaic portion of an iambic line, as in this example from "Teddy Bears' Picnic" (1932):

The / little / teddy / bears are / having a / lovely / time to/day

The substitution of a tribrach for a trochee is often associated with children's poetry. An example in a more serious poem is the following, from Sam Ryder's song "Space Man" (2022). In the refrain a tribrach is used for the words "nothing but" in a similar way with three short equal notes in the music:

I've / searched a/round the / uni/verse
/ Been down / some black / holes
There's / nothing but / space, / man

A double tribrach (as in "higgledy piggledy") is also found in English poetry, for example in the nursery rhyme "Hickory Dickory Dock" ( 1744):

/  Hickory / dickory / dock.
The / mouse ran / up the / clock.

Another example is found in the children's poem "Disobedience" (1924) by A. A. Milne (from his collection When We Were Very Young):

/ James / James
/ Morrison / Morrison
/ Weatherby / George Du/pree
/ Took / great
/ Care of his / Mother,
/ Though he was / only / three.

References

Metrical feet